"A Sound of Different Drummers" was an American television play broadcast live on October 3, 1957, as part of the CBS television series, Playhouse 90. It was the fourth episode of the second season. John Frankenheimer directed, and Sterling Hayden starred.

Plot
A young security police officer in a future totalitarian state is assigned to suppress illegal intellectual activity, including executing book readers. He catches a librarian hiding a banned book and joins her in reading books.

Cast 
 Sterling Hayden as Gordon Miller, the young security police officer
 Diana Lynn as Susan Ward, the idealist librarian
 John Ireland as Ben Hammond, a satisfied conformist
 David Opatoshu as Ellis, the chief trial judge and secret reader

Tony Randall hosted the broadcast.

Production
Martin Manulis was the producer and John Frankenheimer the director. The teleplay was written by Robert Alan Aurthur.

Reception
In The New York Times, Jack Gould called it "the boldest and most stimulating" play of the season, an "intellectually compelling narrative", and "a powerful drama protesting the disease of conformity." He also praised the futuristic settings and sensitive direction of John Frankenheimer.

References

1957 American television episodes
Playhouse 90 (season 2) episodes
1957 television plays